WEELS may refer to:

 Websource for Electron Energy Loss Spectra
 Wind Erosion on European Light Soils
 Working Group on European Exposure Limits